The term First Athenian School denotes the literary production in Athens between 1830 and 1880. After Greek Independence, the basic intellectual centres of the Greek world were the Ionian Islands (with the Heptanese School) and Athens, the capital of the new Greek Kingdom. Many of the leading members of the First Athenian School were of Phanariote origin, whence it is sometimes referred to as the Phanariotic School (Φαναριωτική Σχολή).

The main element of the school was romanticism. The New Athenian School developed as a reaction against the First Athenian School from the 1880s on.

General traits
Some general traits of the school were:
Extensive use of Katharevousa, the purest form of the modern Greek
Influence by the French romanticism
Influence by the Phanariotic poetry
Rhetorical style
Patriotic tone, themes from the Greek War of Independence

Notable representatives
Theodoros G. Orphanides
Dimitrios Paparrigopoulos
Alexandros Rizos Rangavis
Panagiotis Soutsos
Alexandros Soutsos
Spyridon Vassiliadis
Demetrios Bernardakis
Dimosthenis Valavanis

Notable works
Demos and Heleni (1831) by Alexandros Rizos Rangavis
Leander (1834), novel by Panagiotis Soutsos
The Wedding of Koutroulis (1845), comedy by Alexandros Rizos Rangavis
Maria Doxapatri (1857), play by Demetrios Bernardakis
History of Modern Greek Literature (1877), historic review by Alexandros Rizos Rangavis

References 
R. Beaton, An Introduction to Modern Greek Literature, Oxford University Press, 1999.
M. Vitti, Ιστορία της Νεοελληνικής Λογοτεχνίας [History of Modern Greek Literature], ed. Οδυσσέας, Athens, 2003.

 
Phanariotes